Cherie is a feminine given name. 

Chérie or Cherie may also refer to:

 Cherie, a stage name of Cyndi Almouzni (born 1984), French singer
 Cherie (album), Cherie's debut album
 Chérie Carter-Scott (born 1949), author
 Chérie FM, a French radio station
 the title character of Petra Chérie, an Italian comic series

See also
 
 Agustina Cherri (born 1983), Argentine actress known as Cherri
 Sherie Rene Scott (born 1967), American actress known as Sherie
 Shery (born 1975), Guatemalan singer
 Chari (disambiguation)
 Chéri (disambiguation)
 Cheri (disambiguation)
 Chery (disambiguation)
 Cherrie (disambiguation)
 Cherry (disambiguation)
 Shari (disambiguation)
 Sherrie (disambiguation)
 Sherry (disambiguation)